Orana is a north-western suburb of Albany in southern Western Australia, northwest of Albany's central business district. Its local government area is the City of Albany.

It was gazetted as a suburb in 1979.

Geography 

The suburb is bounded in the north by Anson Road, to the south and east by the South Coast Highway and to the west by Le Grand Avenue.
Albany Highway passes through the middle of the suburb.

Education
The suburb contains North Albany Senior High School and Parklands School (Albany), a Montessori school.

References

Suburbs of Albany, Western Australia